The 2005–06 Montenegrin First League was the last edition of the tournament as the second-highest division. Due to the dissolution of the state union between Serbia and Montenegro in June 2006, the Montenegrin First League became the top division of Montenegro from then on.

League table

Relegation play-offs
The 8th placed team were played against the 2nd placed team of the Montenegrin Republic League in two-legged relegation play-offs after the end of the season.

First leg

Second leg

Mladost gained promotion to 2006–07 Montenegrin First League, while Zora relegated to 2006–07 Montenegrin Second League.

References

2005-06
2
Monte